Isaac Munuswamy Poobalan is an Anglican priest. He has been Provost of St Andrew's Cathedral, Aberdeen since 2015.

Biography 
Poobalan was born in 1962. He studied at University of Edinburgh.

Pooblan was ordained in 1995. He served his curacy at St Peter's, Lutton Place, Edinburgh. He was then Priest in charge at St Clement, Aberdeen. He was Rector of St John the Evangelist, Aberdeen from 2001 until his appointment as Provost. He is also Chaplain of Robert Gordon University.

References

1962 births
Alumni of the University of Edinburgh
Provosts of St Andrew's Cathedral, Aberdeen
Living people
People associated with Robert Gordon University